Ryoichi Goto (born 18 July 1949) is a Japanese weightlifter. He competed in the men's middle heavyweight event at the 1972 Summer Olympics.

References

1949 births
Living people
Japanese male weightlifters
Olympic weightlifters of Japan
Weightlifters at the 1972 Summer Olympics
Place of birth missing (living people)